Mati Talvik (11 April 1942 – 25 July 2018) was an Estonian television journalist.

Talvik was born and raised in Tallinn. He was the son of lawyer Edgar Talvik. His uncle was singer and journalist Kalmer Tennosaar. 

From 1967 until 1970, he studied at Tartu State University in journalism speciality. In 1981 he graduated from Leningrad Higher Party School (later Leningrad Communist University).

Since 1968 he worked at Eesti Televisioon (ETV). He created, edited and directed many popular television programs and series, including Käokava (1971-1972), Eesti aja lood (2007-2010) and Ajavaod (2010-2011).

Awards:
 1980: Jaan Anvelt prize
 1982: Meritorious journalist of the Estonian SSR
 1985: Valdo Pant prize
 2006: Order of the White Star, IV class.
 2008: Estonian Broadcasting Union Golden Microphone Award

Filmography
Director of the documental films:
 Vilma (1979)
 Piimamehed Põlvast (1980)
 Linn põlevatel kividel (1981)
 Moonsundi sügis (1984)
 Balti loorberid (2009)

References

1942 births
2018 deaths
Estonian journalists
Estonian television personalities
Recipients of the Order of the White Star, 4th Class
University of Tartu alumni
People from Tallinn
Burials at Metsakalmistu